SacI is a restriction enzyme isolated from the bacterium Streptomyces achromogenes.

References

Restriction enzymes
Streptomyces